Washington Township is one of seventeen townships in Kosciusko County, Indiana. As of the 2010 census, its population was 2,996 and it contained 1,335 housing units.

History
Washington Township was organized in 1838.

The Robert Orr Polygonal Barn was listed on the National Register of Historic Places in 1993.

Geography

Cities and towns
 Pierceton

Unincorporated towns
 Wooster at 
(This list is based on USGS data and may include former settlements.)

Education
Washington Township residents are served by the Pierceton & Washington Township Public Library in Pierceton.

References

External links
 Indiana Township Association
 United Township Association of Indiana

Townships in Kosciusko County, Indiana
Townships in Indiana